Thomas Richter (born 19 August 1980 in Görlitz, East Germany) is a former German football goalkeeper.

Career 
He made his debut on the professional league level in the 2. Bundesliga for SV Wehen Wiesbaden on 23 September 2007 when he started in a game against FC Carl Zeiss Jena. Richter left the club on 30 June 2009 and signed as a free agent with South African club Mpumalanga Black Aces.

Richter is the second German born goalkeeper who played in South Africa after Lutz Pfannenstiel (1998 for Orlando Pirates).

References 

1980 births
Living people
People from Görlitz
German footballers
Germany youth international footballers
Association football goalkeepers
2. Bundesliga players
Borussia Mönchengladbach II players
SV Elversberg players
SV Darmstadt 98 players
Sportfreunde Siegen players
SV Wehen Wiesbaden players
FC 08 Homburg players
German expatriate sportspeople in South Africa
Expatriate soccer players in South Africa
Footballers from Saxony
TSV Schwaben Augsburg players
German expatriate footballers